Original Golden Hits, Vol. 2 is an album by Jerry Lee Lewis released on the Sun Record Company label in 1969. It is the sequel to Vol. 1, also issued in 1969, and compiled many of Lewis's popular Sun sides. Following up on his recent successes on the country charts, Original Golden Hits, Vol. 2 peaked at number 6 on the Billboard country albums chart.

Track listing

1969 compilation albums
Jerry Lee Lewis albums
Sun Records compilation albums